Plains hide painting is a traditional Plains Indian artistic practice of painting on either tanned or raw animal hides. Tipis, tipi liners, shields, parfleches, robes, clothing, drums, and winter counts could all be painted.

Genres
Art historian Joyce Szabo writes that Plains artists were concerned "with composition, balance, symmetry, and variety." Designs can be similar to those found in earlier rock art and later quillwork and beadwork.

Geometric painting

Plains women traditionally paint abstract, geometric designs. Bright colors were preferred and areas were filled with solid fields of color. Cross-hatching was a last resort used only when paint was scarce. Negative space was important and designs were discussed by women in terms of their negative space. Dots are used to break up large areas.

Buffalo robes and parfleches were frequently painted with geometrical patterns. Parfleches are rawhide envelopes for carrying and storing goods, including food. Their painted designs are thought to be stylized maps, featuring highly abstract geographic features such as rivers or mountains.

The "Feathered Sun" is a reoccurring motif of stylized feathers in several concentric circles. It visually connects a feather warbonnet to the sun.

Representational painting

Traditionally, men painted representational art. They painted living things. Plains Indian male artists use a system of pictographic signs, characterized by two-dimensionality, readily recognizable by other members of their tribe. This picture writing could be used for anything from directions and maps to love letters. Images were streamlined and backgrounds were minimal for clarity. Representational painting typically fell into two categories: heraldic accounts or calendars.

Heraldic painting
Men recorded their battle and hunting exploits on hide tipi liners, robes, and even shirts. Figures were scattered across the hide and semi-transparent images sometimes overlapped each other. Narrative hides were often read right to left, with the protagonist emerging from the right. Allies are on the right with enemies on the left. Men and horses were commonly painted, and other popular motifs included footprints, hoofprints, name glyphs, bullets, and arrows. An 1868 Blackfoot buffalo hide features the protagonist no fewer than eight times.

Painted hides also commemorate historical events, such as treaty signings.

After 1850, hide painting grew in complexity with finer lines and additional details added. Introduced technologies influenced hide painting, and a 19th-century Omaha tipi featured steamboats.

Calendars

Traditional Plains calendars are called winter counts because among most Plains tribes they feature a single pictogram that defined the entire year. Prior to using the Gregorian calendar, Lakota people counted years from first snow to first snow. Kiowas were unique in choosing two images per year– one for the winter and one representing the summer Sun Dance.

Before the late 19th century when buffalo became scarce, winter counts were painted in buffalo hides. The annual pictograms could be arranged in a linear, spiral, or serpentine pattern.

Visionary painting
Visions and dreams could inspire designs. Buckskin covers for circular rawhide hide shields, in particular, are inspired by men's visions and can include paintings of humans, animals, or spirit beings, reflecting the owner's personal powers and providing protection. Designs could be obtained from the warriors who received the visions or from medicine men. Cheyenne men who received visions were allowed to make four shields with the design. Among the Kiowa and Kiowa-Apache about 50 possible shield designs existed.

Tipis could be painted with visionary designs. The design and related power belonged to the tipi-owner, which could be transferred by inheritance, marriage, or, among some tribes such as the Blackfeet, sale.

Followers of the Ghost dance religion painted visionary designs on their clothing. Arapaho and Lakota ghost dance shirts were painted with crows, magpies, turtles, and cedar trees.

Process and materials
Buffalo hides, as well as deer, elk, and other animal hides, are painted. Clothing and robes are often brain-tanned to be soft and supple. Parfleches, shields, and moccasin soles are rawhide for toughness.

In the past, Plains artists used a bone or wood stylus to paint with natural mineral and vegetable pigments. Sections of buffalo rib could be ground to expose the marrow, which was absorbent and worked like a contemporary ink marker. Swelling cottonwood buds provided brown pigment. Lakota artists used to burn yellow clay to produce ceremonial red paint. Lakotas associated blue pigments with women.

In earlier times, all members of a tribe might paint but highly skilled individuals might be commissioned by others to create artwork. Before the 20th century, when a Kiowa man needed to repaint his lodge, he would invite 20-30 friends to paint the entire tipi in a single day. He would then treat them all to a feast.

Related art forms
Many tribes throughout North America, besides those on the Plains, also painted hides, following different aesthetic traditions. Subarctic tribes are known for their painted caribou hides. On the Plains, when buffalo herds were being slaughtered in the late 19th century, other painting surfaces became available, such as muslin, paper, and canvas, giving birth to Ledger art. Contemporary Plains beadwork and jewelry used designs from hide painting.

Gallery

Notable Plains hide painters
Kicking Bear, Oglala Lakota
Naiche, Chiricahua Plains Apache
Silver Horn, Kiowa
Tohausen, Kiowa

See also

Native American art
Painting in the Americas before Colonization
 American Bison Society
 American bison (Bison bison)
 Bison hunting
 Bison
 Buffalo Commons
 Buffalo Hunters' War
 European bison
 Great bison belt
 Wind Cave Bison Herd
 Wisent
 Wood bison
 Yellowstone Park Bison Herd

Notes

References
Dubin, Lois Sherr. North American Indian Jewelry and Adornment: From Prehistory to the Present. New York: Harry N. Abrams, 1999. .
Penney, David W. North American Indian Art. London: Thames & Hudson, 2004. .
Szabo, Joyce M. Howling Wolf and the History of Ledger Art. Albuquerque: University of New Mexico Press, 1984. .

External links

 Plains Art, Glenbow Museum
 Tracking the Buffalo:  Stories from a Buffalo Hide Painting, National Museum of American History (for children)
Native paths: American Indian art from the collection of Charles and Valerie Diker, an exhibition catalog from The Metropolitan Museum of Art (fully available online as PDF), which contains material on Plains hide painting

American art movements
Bison
Indigenous culture of the Great Plains
Indigenous painting of the Americas
Indigenous art in Canada
Hide